Song Wencong (26 March 1930 – 22 March 2016) was a Chinese aerospace engineer and aircraft designer, who was responsible for the development of the single seat version of the Chengdu J-10. He was a member of the Chinese Academy of Engineering.

Biography
Song was born on 26 March 1930, in Kunming, Yunnan, with his ancestral home in Dali, Yunnan. He joined a youth organization of the Communist Party of China by the end of 1948. He enlisted in the Yunnan-Guangxi-Guizhou border region column of PLA in July 1949 as a scout. In May 1951, he joined the Chinese People's Volunteer Army to fight against the American-led United Nations forces in the Korean War. In August 1954, he was accepted to Harbin Institute of Military Engineering (now Harbin Engineering University), where he majored in aircraft engine at the Air Force Engineering Department. After graduating in July 1960 he was assigned to Shenyang 601 Design District as a designer. He was a designer of Chengdu 611 Design District from 1970 to 1974, and he was elected deputy chief designer for 1977 and chief designer for 1980.

At the age of 56, he was appointed chief designer of the Chengdu J-10.

In 2003, he was elected a member of the Chinese Academy of Engineering.

He was honored as one of the top ten people touching China in 2009.

On 22 March 2016, Song died at 301 Military Hospital in Beijing, aged 85.

Awards
 The second prize of National Scientific and Technological Progress Award

See also
Chengdu Aircraft Industry Corporation
Chengdu Aircraft Design Institute
Yang Wei

References

1930 births
2016 deaths
People from Kunming
Chinese aircraft designers
Engineers from Yunnan
Harbin Engineering University alumni
Chinese military personnel of the Korean War
Members of the Chinese Academy of Engineering